The following is a list of the 28 municipalities (comuni) of the Province of Grosseto, Tuscany, Italy.

List

See also 
List of municipalities of Italy

References 

 Grosseto